Widow Morgan was a  founding settler of Norwalk, Connecticut. There is very little information in the historical records about her. She is listed among the "Ludlow Agreement" settlers in 1650.

She is listed on the Founders Stone bearing the names of the founders of Norwalk in the East Norwalk Historical Cemetery.

References 

1600s births
1600s deaths
American Puritans
Founding settlers of Norwalk, Connecticut
Year of birth missing
Year of death missing